Opteron is the name of a central processing unit (CPU) family within the AMD64 line. Designed by Advanced Micro Devices (AMD) for the server market, Opteron competed with Intel's Xeon. The Opteron family is succeeded by the Zen-based Epyc, and Ryzen Threadripper and Threadripper Pro series.

For Socket 940 and Socket 939 Opterons, each chip has a three-digit model number, in the form Opteron XYY. For Socket F and Socket AM2 Opterons, each chip has a four-digit model number, in the form Opteron XZYY. For all Opterons, the first digit (the X) specifies the number of CPUs on the target machine:
 1 – has 1 processor (uniprocessor)
 2 – has 2 processors (dual processor)
 8 – has 4 or 8 processors

For Socket F and Socket AM2 Opterons, the second digit (the Z) represents the processor generation. Presently, only 2 (dual-core), DDR2, 3 (quad-core) and 4 (six-core) are used.

For all Opterons, the last two digits in the model number (the YY) indicate the clock rate (frequency) of a CPU, a higher number indicating a higher clock rate. This speed indication is comparable to processors of the same generation if they have the same amount of cores. Single-cores and dual-cores have different indications, despite sometimes having the same clock rate.

Model number methodology for the AMD Opteron 4000 and 6000 Series processors.
AMD Opteron processors are identified by a four digit model number, ZYXX, where:
Z – denotes product series
 4000 Series = Low cost and power optimized 1- and 2-way servers
 6000 Series = High performance 2- and 4-way servers
Y – denotes series generation
 41xx = 1st generation of 4000 series
 61xx = 1st generation of 6000 series
XX – communicates a change in product specifications within the series, and is not a relative measure of performance.

The suffix HE or EE denotes a high-efficiency or energy-efficiency model with a lower thermal design power (TDP) than a standard Opteron. The suffix SE denotes a top-of-the-line model with a higher TDP than a standard Opteron.

Feature overview

CPUs

APUs
APU features table

K8 based Opterons

First Generation Opterons

Opteron 100-series "SledgeHammer" (130 nm)
 All models support: MMX, SSE, SSE2, Enhanced 3DNow!, NX bit, AMD64
 All models with OPN ending in AG support up to Registered PC2700 DDR SDRAM
 All other models support up to Registered PC3200 DDR SDRAM
 All models only support single-processor configurations

Opteron 200-series "SledgeHammer" (130 nm)
 All models support: MMX, SSE, SSE2, Enhanced 3DNow!, NX bit, AMD64
 All models with OPN ending in AH support up to Registered PC2700 DDR SDRAM
 All other models support up to Registered PC3200 DDR SDRAM
 All models support up to two-processor configurations

Opteron 800-series "SledgeHammer" (130 nm)
 All models support: MMX, SSE, SSE2, Enhanced 3DNow!, NX bit, AMD64
 All models with OPN ending in AI support up to Registered PC2700 DDR SDRAM
 All other models support up to Registered PC3200 DDR SDRAM
 All models support up to eight-processor configurations

Opteron 100-series "Venus" (90 nm, socket 939)
 All models support: MMX, SSE, SSE2, SSE3, Enhanced 3DNow!, NX bit, AMD64
 All models support up to Unbuffered PC3200 DDR SDRAM
 All models only support single-processor configurations

Opteron 100-series "Venus" (90 nm, socket 940)
 All models support: MMX, SSE, SSE2, SSE3, Enhanced 3DNow!, NX bit, AMD64
 All models support up to Registered PC3200 DDR SDRAM
 All models only support single-processor configurations

Opteron 200-series "Troy" (90 nm)
 All models support: MMX, SSE, SSE2, SSE3, Enhanced 3DNow!, NX bit, AMD64
 All models support up to Registered PC3200 DDR SDRAM
 All models support up to two-processor configurations

Opteron 800-series "Athens" (90 nm)
 All models support: MMX, SSE, SSE2, SSE3, Enhanced 3DNow!, NX bit, AMD64
 All models support up to Registered PC3200 DDR SDRAM
 All models support up to eight-processor configurations

Opteron 100-series "Denmark" (90 nm)
 All models support: MMX, SSE, SSE2, SSE3, Enhanced 3DNow!, NX bit, AMD64
 All models support up to Unbuffered PC3200 DDR SDRAM
 All models only support single-processor configurations

Opteron 200-series "Italy" (90 nm)
 All models support: MMX, SSE, SSE2, SSE3, Enhanced 3DNow!, NX bit, AMD64
 All models support up to Registered PC3200 DDR SDRAM
 All models support up to two-processor configurations

Opteron 800-series "Egypt" (90 nm)
 All models support: MMX, SSE, SSE2, SSE3, Enhanced 3DNow!, NX bit, AMD64
 All models support up to Registered PC3200 DDR SDRAM
 All models support up to eight-processor configurations

Second Generation Opterons

Opteron 1200-series "Santa Ana" (90 nm)
 All models support: MMX, SSE, SSE2, SSE3, Enhanced 3DNow!, NX bit, AMD64, AMD-V
 All models support up to Unbuffered PC2-6400 DDR2 SDRAM
 All models only support single-processor configurations

Opteron 2200-series "Santa Rosa" (90 nm)
 All models support: MMX, SSE, SSE2, SSE3, Enhanced 3DNow!, NX bit, AMD64, AMD-V
 All models support up to Registered PC2-5300 DDR2 SDRAM
 All models support up to two-processor configurations

Opteron 8200-series "Santa Rosa" (90 nm)
 All models support: MMX, SSE, SSE2, SSE3, Enhanced 3DNow!, NX bit, AMD64, AMD-V
 All models support up to Registered PC2-5300 DDR2 SDRAM
 All models support up to eight-processor configurations

K10 based Opterons

Third Generation Opterons

Opteron 1300-series "Budapest" (65 nm)
 All models support: MMX, SSE, SSE2, SSE3, SSE4a, Enhanced 3DNow!, NX bit, AMD64, AMD-V (SVM & Rapid Virtualization Indexing)
 All models support up to Unbuffered PC2-6400 DDR2 SDRAM
 All models support single-processor configurations
 B2-Stepping does have the TLB-Bug (Translation Lookaside Buffer, see also AMD "errata number 298")

Opteron 2300-series "Barcelona" (65 nm)
 All models support: MMX, SSE, SSE2, SSE3, SSE4a, Enhanced 3DNow!, NX bit, AMD64, AMD-V (SVM & Rapid Virtualization Indexing)
 All models support up to Registered PC2-5300 DDR2 SDRAM
 All models support up to two-processor configurations

Opteron 8300-series "Barcelona" (65 nm)
 All models support: MMX, SSE, SSE2, SSE3, SSE4a, Enhanced 3DNow!, NX bit, AMD64, AMD-V (SVM & Rapid Virtualization Indexing)
 All models support up to Registered PC2-5300 DDR2 SDRAM
 All models support up to eight-processor configurations

Opteron 1300-series "Suzuka" (45 nm)
 All models support: MMX, SSE, SSE2, SSE3, SSE4a, Enhanced 3DNow!, NX bit, AMD64, AMD-V (SVM & Rapid Virtualization Indexing)
 All models support up to Unbuffered PC3-10600 DDR3 SDRAM
 All models support single-processor configurations

115W TDP Page 54 http://support.amd.com/us/Processor_TechDocs/43374.pdf

Opteron 2300-series "Shanghai" (45 nm)
 All models support: MMX, SSE, SSE2, SSE3, SSE4a, Enhanced 3DNow!, NX bit, AMD64, AMD-V (SVM & Rapid Virtualization Indexing)
 All models support up to Registered PC2-6400 DDR2 SDRAM
 All models support up to two-processor configurations

Opteron 8300-series "Shanghai" (45 nm)
 All models support: MMX, SSE, SSE2, SSE3, SSE4a, Enhanced 3DNow!, NX bit, AMD64, AMD-V (SVM & Rapid Virtualization Indexing)
 All models support up to Registered PC2-6400 DDR2 SDRAM
 All models support up to eight-processor configurations

Opteron 2400-series "Istanbul" (45 nm)
 All models support: MMX, SSE, SSE2, SSE3, SSE4a, Enhanced 3DNow!, NX bit, AMD64, AMD-V (SVM & Rapid Virtualization Indexing), HT-Assist
 All models support up to Registered PC2-6400 DDR2 SDRAM
 All models support up to two-socket configurations

Opteron 8400-series "Istanbul" (45 nm)
 All models support: MMX, SSE, SSE2, SSE3, SSE4a, Enhanced 3DNow!, NX bit, AMD64, AMD-V (SVM & Rapid Virtualization Indexing), HT-Assist
 All models support up to Registered PC2-6400 DDR2 SDRAM
 All models support up to eight-processor configurations
 Istanbul models have 6 MB of L3 cache but only 5 MB are visible with the HT Assist feature activated using 1 MB as a directory cache.

4100- & 6100-series Opterons

Opteron 4100-series "Lisbon" (45 nm)
 All models support: MMX, SSE, SSE2, SSE3, SSE4a, Enhanced 3DNow!, NX bit, AMD64, Cool'n'Quiet, AMD-V
 All models support up to two socket configurations
 Memory support: Up to 4 DIMMs per socket
 Memory controller: Two channels of UDDR3, RDDR3 up to PC3-10667
 Lisbon models have 6MB of L3 cache but only 5 MB are visible when the HT Assist feature is activated, using 1 MB as directory cache.

Opteron 6100-series "Magny-Cours" (45 nm)
 All models support: MMX, SSE, SSE2, SSE3, SSE4a, Enhanced 3DNow!, NX bit, AMD64, Cool'n'Quiet, AMD-V (SVM & Rapid Virtualization Indexing), HT-Assist
 All models support two or four socket configurations
 Memory support: Up to 12 DIMMs per socket
 Memory controller: Four channels of UDDR3, RDDR3 up to PC3-10667
 Magny-Cours models have 12 MB of L3 cache (2 × 6 MB) but only 10 MB is visible with the HT Assist feature activated using 2 MB as a directory cache.

Bulldozer based Opterons

3200-, 4200- & 6200-series Opterons

Opteron 3200-series "Zurich" (32 nm)

 All models support: MMX, SSE, SSE2, SSE3, SSSE3, SSE4.1, SSE4.2, SSE4a, IOMMU, NX bit, AMD64, AMD-V, AES, CLMUL, AVX, CVT16–F16C, XOP, FMA4.
 All models support single socket configurations
 Memory support: Up to 4 DIMMs per socket
 Memory controller: Two channels of UDDR3, RDDR3 up to PC3-15000
 Die size: 315 mm²

Opteron 4200-series  "Valencia" (32 nm)
 All models support: MMX, SSE, SSE2, SSE3, SSSE3, SSE4.1, SSE4.2, SSE4a, NX bit, AMD64, AMD-V, AES, CLMUL, AVX, XOP, FMA4.
 All models support up to two socket configurations
 Memory support: Up to 4 DIMMs per socket
 Memory controller: Two channels of UDDR3, RDDR3 up to PC3-12800

Opteron 6200-series  "Interlagos" (32 nm)
 All models support: MMX, SSE, SSE2, SSE3, SSSE3, SSE4.1, SSE4.2, SSE4a, NX bit, AMD64, AMD-V, AES, CLMUL, AVX, XOP, FMA4.
 All models support two or four socket configurations
 Memory support: Up to 12 DIMMs per socket
 Memory controller: Four channels of UDDR3, RDDR3 up to PC3-12800
 Interlagos models have 16 MB of L3 cache (2x8 MB) but only 14 MB is visible with the HT Assist feature activated using 2 MB as a directory cache.

Piledriver based Opterons

3300-, 4300- & 6300-series Opterons

Opteron 3300-series "Delhi" (32 nm)

 All models support: MMX, SSE, SSE2, SSE3, SSSE3, SSE4.1, SSE4.2, SSE4a, NX bit, AMD64, AMD-V, AES, CLMUL, AVX, AVX 1.1, XOP, FMA3, FMA4, CVT16–F16C, AMD Turbo Core3.0., ECC
 All models support single socket configurations
 Memory support: Up to 4 DIMMs per socket
 Memory controller: Two channels of UDDR3, RDDR3 up to PC3-15000
 Die size: 315 mm²

Opteron 4300-series  "Seoul" (32 nm)
 All models support: MMX, SSE, SSE2, SSE3, SSSE3, SSE4.1, SSE4.2, SSE4a, NX bit, AMD64, AMD-V, AES, CLMUL, AVX, AVX 1.1, XOP, FMA3, FMA4, CVT16–F16C, AMD Turbo Core, ECC
 All models support up to two socket configurations
 Memory support: Up to 4 DIMMs per socket
 Memory controller: Two channels of UDDR3, RDDR3 up to PC3-15000

Opteron 6300-series  "Abu Dhabi" (32 nm)
 All models support: MMX, SSE, SSE2, SSE3, SSSE3, SSE4.1, SSE4.2, SSE4a, NX bit, AMD64, AMD-V, IOMMU, AES, CLMUL, AVX, AVX 1.1, BMI1 (Bit Manipulation Instructions 1), ABM (Advanced Bit Manipulation), TBM (Trailing Bit Manipulation instructions), XOP, FMA3, FMA4, CVT16–F16C, Turbo Core 2.0, EVP (Enhanced Virus Protection), ECC''
 All models support two or four socket configurations
 Memory support: Up to 12 DIMMs per socket
 Memory controller: Four channels of UDDR3, RDDR3 up to PC3-15000
 Abu Dhabi models have 16 MB of L3 cache (2x8 MB) but only 14 MB is visible with the HT Assist feature activated using 2 MB as a directory cache.
 Two new 6300 models code-named "Warsaw" were added in 2014 (6338P and 6370P) that operate at lower clock frequencies using less power.

Excavator based Opterons

X3000-series Opterons

Opteron X3000-series  "Toronto" (28 nm)
 All models support: MMX, SSE, SSE2, SSE3, SSSE3, SSE4.1, SSE4.2, SSE4a, AMD64, AMD-V, AES, CLMUL, AVX, AVX 1.1, AVX2, XOP, FMA3, FMA4, F16C, ABM, BMI1, BMI2, TBM, RDRAND
 Two or Four CPU cores based on the Excavator microarchitecture
 L1 Cache: 32 KB Data per core and 96 KB Instructions per module
 Memory controller: Two channels of DDR4 SDRAM up to PC4-19200
 GPU based on Graphics Core Next (GCN) 3rd Generation architecture

Jaguar-based Opterons

X1100 and X2100 series Opterons

Opteron X1100-series "Kyoto" (28nm) 
 Socket FT3 (BGA)
 4 CPU cores (Jaguar (microarchitecture))
 SSE4.1, SSE4.2, AVX, AES, F16C, BMI1, AMD-V, AMD-P (power management) support
 Turbo Dock Technology, C6 and CC6 low power states
 128-bit FPU

Opteron X2100-series "Kyoto" (28nm) 
 Socket FT3 (BGA)
 4 CPU cores (Jaguar (microarchitecture))
 SSE4.1, SSE4.2, AVX, AES, F16C, BMI1 support
 Turbo Dock Technology, C6 and CC6 low power states
 GPU based on Graphics Core Next (GCN) architecture

ARM Cortex A57 based Opterons

Opteron A1100-series "Seattle" (28nm)
The AMD Opteron A1100 is an enterprise-class ARM Cortex-A57-based SOC.

 Up to 64 GB DDR3L-1600 and up to 128GB DDR4-1866 with ECC
  SoC peripherals include 6 × SATA 3,  2 × Integrated 10 GbE LAN and 8 PCI Express lanes in ×8, ×4 and ×2 configurations.

See also
 List of AMD chipsets
 List of AMD processors with 3D graphics
 List of AMD Epyc microprocessors
 List of AMD FX microprocessors
 Table of AMD processors

References

External links
 
 AMD Technical Docs

Opteron
AMD Opteron